Idrettsforeningen Herkules is a Norwegian multi-sports club from Skien, Telemark. It is organized as an alliance club with independent sections for association football, team handball, track and field athletics, gymnastics, Nordic skiing and speed skating.

The club was founded on 4 May 1920 and used a moor next to Skiensfjorden Skofabrikk. The club colours are yellow and green.

The men's football team ended last in the 2019 4. divisjon. It was formerly a staple in the 3. divisjon, with a presence from 2000 to 2002 and 2004 to 2013. Earlier, after the Second World War II, the club had spells on Norway's second tier in 1952–53 and 1955–56. It is also known as the childhood club of Rune Almenning Jarstein.

References

Official site

Football clubs in Norway
Sport in Skien
1920 establishments in Norway
Association football clubs established in 1920
Athletics clubs in Norway